Chooz is a commune in the Ardennes department in northern France.

The Chooz Nuclear Power Plant is located in Chooz, as are the associated Chooz and Double Chooz neutrino oscillation experiments. The Pointe de Givet National Nature Reserve is also partly located on the commune.

Population

See also
Communes of the Ardennes department

References

Communes of Ardennes (department)
Ardennes communes articles needing translation from French Wikipedia